Kottagiri Saddle dam (Malayalam:കോട്ടഗിരി തടയണ) is an earthen dam constructed across Karamanthodu which is a tributary of Kabani river at Thariyode village of Wayanad district in Kerala, India. It is a saddle dam of the Banasura sagar reservoir built as part of The Kuttiyadi Augmentatuin Scheme. The dam was constructed and is maintained by Kerala State Electricity Board.

The Kuttiyadi Augmentation Scheme comprises a main dam known as Banasurasagar Dam, an earth fill dam and a concrete gravity spillway dam and six saddle dams:
 Kosani – Earth fill dam – 13.8 m high
 Near Kottagiri – Earth fill dam – 11.0 m high
 Kottagiri – Earth fill dam – 14.5 m high
 Kuttiyadi – Concrete dam – 16.5 m high
 Nayamoola – Earth fill dam – 3.5 m high
 Manjoora – Earth fill dam – 4.0 m high
All the dams, except Kuttiady saddle, are earth fill dams. The Kuttiyadi saddle dam is a concrete dam. The spillway is located adjacent to the main dam at the right bank of the original river course. The water spread area at FRL / MWL is 12.77 km2.. The catchment area of Banasurasagar Dam is 61.44 km2..

Specifications
LocationLatitude:11⁰36’53”N
Longitude:75⁰54’58”E
Panchayath : Thariode
Village : Thariode
District : Wayanad
River Basin : Kabani
River : Karamanthodu
Release from Dam to river : NA
Year of completion : 2004
Name of Project : Kuttiady Augmentation Scheme
Type of Project : Multi purpose
Dam Features
Type of Dam : Homogeneous rolled earth fill
ClassificationLH : ( Low Height)
Maximum Water Level (MWL) : EL 775.60 m
Full Reservoir Level ( FRL) : EL 775.60 m
Storage at FRL : 209.25 Mm3
Height from deepest foundation :  
Length :  
Spillway : No spillway
Crest Level : NA
River Outlet : Nil
Officers in charge & phone No.Executive Engineer, Dam Safety Division No. V, Thariode, PIN- 673122 Phone – 9446008415
Installed capacity of the Project : 231.75 MW
Assistant Executive Engineer, Dam Safety Sub Division, Thariode PIN- 673122 Phone- 9496004480
Project Identification Code ( PIC) : KL29LH0054
Assistant Engineer, Dam Safety Section, Thariode PIN- 673122 Phone – 9496005761

Reservoir

The Gross Storage of Kuttiyadi Augmentation (Banasura sagar) Reservoir is 209 Mm3 and live storage 185 Mm3. The water stored in the reservoir is diverted to the reservoir of Kuttiyadi Hydro Electric Project through an interconnecting tunnel. The sill level of diversion tunnel at inlet is 750.83 m. The size and shape of tunnel is varying. It is varying from 2.35 m dia. circular lined tunnel for a length of 890m &2.85 m D shaped unlined tunnel for a length of 3873 m. Maximum diversion is11.6 m3/s. The diverted water is used for power generation from Kuttiyadi Power Station. FRL of the reservoir is 775.60 m. Top level of dam is 778.50 m. There are four radial gates, each of size 10.97 m x 9.20 m. Crest level of spillway is 767.00 m. Spillway capacity is 1664 m3/s. One lower level outlet is provided in the spillway structure at750.75 m of size 1.10 m X 1.75 m to release irrigation requirement.

References

Dams in Kerala
Dams completed in 2004